Calhetas is a freguesia ("civil parish") in the municipality of Ribeira Grande in the Azores. The population in 2011 was 988, in an area of 4.70 km². Calhetas is the smallest parish in area in Ribeira Grande. It contains the localities Calhetas and Figueira do Mato.

References

Parishes of Ribeira Grande, Azores